Lucien Lux (born 13 September 1956 in Troisvierges) is a politician and trade unionist from Luxembourg.  A member of the Luxembourg Socialist Workers' Party, Lux was in the government from 2004 until 2009, under Jean-Claude Juncker.

He worked for Chemins de Fer Luxembourgeois, and in 1978 joined the Confederation of Independent Trade Unions (OGB-L) as union secretary.  Lux was the chairman of the Bettembourg branch of the Luxembourg Socialist Workers' Party (LSAP) from 1986, and he became mayor of Bettembourg on 1 January 1988, which he would hold until his appointment to the government.

The 1989 elections saw Lux first enter the Chamber of Deputies, representing Circonscription Sud, after which he stepped down from his position at the OGB-L.  He was re-elected in 1994 and in 1999 (in fourth place amongst LSAP candidates in Sud).

He was elected as Secretary-General of the LSAP in 2002, putting him in charge of the 2004 elections.  At those elections, he was placed fourth once again, whilst the LSAP dislodged the Democratic Party from the governing coalition.  As a result, Lux was appointed as Minister for the Environment and Minister for Transport after the 2004 general election, which he held until 23 July 2009, when the posts were abolished.  At the 2009 elections, Lux was returned to the Chamber, but only fifth amongst LSAP candidates.

Footnotes

|-

Ministers for Transport of Luxembourg
Ministers for the Environment of Luxembourg
Mayors of places in Luxembourg
Members of the Chamber of Deputies (Luxembourg)
Members of the Chamber of Deputies (Luxembourg) from Sud
Councillors in Bettembourg
Luxembourg Socialist Workers' Party politicians
1956 births
Living people
People from Troisvierges